Morinish South is a rural locality in the Rockhampton Region, Queensland, Australia.

Geography
The Fitzroy River forms the western boundary and part of the southern.

References 

Suburbs of Rockhampton Region
Localities in Queensland